This is a round-up of the 2009 Sligo Senior Football Championship to date. Tourlestrane were crowned champions on 4 October after beating the then current winners Eastern Harps

Group stages

The Championship was contested by 14 teams, divided into four groups. Two with three teams and two with four teams. The top two sides in each group advanced to the quarter-finals, with the bottom sides in each group facing the Relegation group stages to retain Senior status for 2010, as the restructuring of the Championships went through its final stages.

Group A

Group B

Group C

Group D

Quarter finals

Semi-finals

Sligo Senior Football Championship Final

Relegation

Group A

Group B

Relegation Final

Reserve Final

Sligo Senior Football Championship
Sligo Senior Football Championship